Foort is a surname. Notable people with the surname include:

James Foort (1921–2020), Canadian inventor, artist, and innovator in the field of prosthetic limbs
Reginald Foort (1893–1980), British cinema organist and theatre organist

See also
Fort (surname)